Vita Nikolaenko (born 4 September 1995) is a Belarusian footballer who plays as a midfielder for Premier League club Dinamo Minsk and the Belarus women's national team.

Career
Nikolaenko has been capped for the Belarus national team, appearing for the team during the 2019 FIFA Women's World Cup qualifying cycle.

References

External links
 
 
 

1995 births
Living people
Women's association football midfielders
Belarusian women's footballers
Footballers from Minsk
Belarus women's international footballers